The Copşa Mică gas field is a natural gas field located in Copșa Mică, Sibiu County. It was discovered in 1915 and developed by and Romgaz.  It began production in 1920 and produces natural gas and condensates. The total proven reserves of the Copşa Mică gas field are around 2.77 trillion cubic feet (80 km³), and production is slated to be around 3.7 million cubic feet/day (0.1×105m³) in 2010.

References

Natural gas fields in Romania